The 1994 470-European-Sailing-Championship was held between June 5 and 12 1994. It was discharged before Röbel.

And was extended in both a men's and a women's competition 470-boat class, in which at the men the Italians Ivaldi / Ivaldi and among women the Spaniards Zabell / via Dufresne after seven / ten races the European title won.

Results

Men

Women

External links 
 Official results men
 Official results women

470 European Championships
1994 in sailing
1994 in German sport
Sailing competitions in Germany